
AD 83 (LXXXIII) was a common year starting on Wednesday (link will display the full calendar) of the Julian calendar. At the time, it was known as the Year of the Consulship of Augustus and Quintus Petillius Rufus (or, less frequently, year 836 Ab urbe condita). The denomination AD 83 for this year has been used since the early medieval period, when the Anno Domini calendar era became the prevalent method in Europe for naming years.

Events

By place

Roman Empire 
 Possible date of the Battle of Mons Graupius (AD 83 or 84).  According to Tacitus, 10,000 Britons and 360 Romans are killed. 
 Emperor Domitian fights the Chatti, a Germanic tribe.  His victory allows the construction of fortifications (Limes) along the Rhine-frontier.
 The Roman fort Inchtuthil is built in Scotland.
 Domitian is, again, also a Roman Consul.
 Possible date that Demetrius of Tarsus visits an island in the Hebrides populated by holy men, possibly druids.
 In Rome, the castration of slaves is prohibited.

Births 
 Vibia Sabina, Roman empress (d. c. 136)

Deaths 
 Marcus Pompeius Silvanus, Roman politician
 Pomponia Graecina, Roman noblewoman

References 

0083

als:80er#Johr 83